The Chevrolet Detroit Grand Prix presented by Lear Corporation was the lone doubleheader event of the 2019 IndyCar Series season, consisting of the 7th and 8th rounds of the championship. The event was held at the Raceway at Belle Isle in Detroit, Michigan. Josef Newgarden won a shortened Race 1, and Scott Dixon won the Sunday race.

Race 1 – Saturday, June 1

Results

Qualifying

Race 
Race shortened to 43 laps due to time limit.

Notes:
 Points include 1 point for leading at least 1 lap during a race, an additional 2 points for leading the most race laps. For Detroit only, 1 bonus point was awarded to the fastest qualifier from both groups.

Championship standings after Race 1 

Drivers' Championship standings

Manufacturer standings

 Note: Only the top five positions are included.

Race 2 – Sunday, June 2

Results

Qualifying

Race 

Notes:
 Points include 1 point for leading at least 1 lap during a race, an additional 2 points for leading the most race laps. For Detroit only, 1 bonus point was awarded to the fastest qualifier from both groups.

Championship standings after Race 2 

Drivers' Championship standings

Manufacturer standings

 Note: Only the top five positions are included.

References 

Chevrolet Detroit Grand Prix
2019 Chevrolet Detroit Grand Prix
Detroit Indy Grand Prix
Chevrolet Detroit Grand Prix
2019 in Detroit